Scott Angus Cameron (November 5, 1921 – April 12, 1993) was a Canadian professional ice hockey player. He played 35 games for the New York Rangers of the National Hockey League during the 1942–43 season. The rest of his career, which lasted from 1940 to 1951, was spent in the minor leagues.. He was born in Prince Albert, Saskatchewan.

On June 27, 1941, Cameron was claimed by the New York Rangers from Philadelphia (AHA) in the Inter-League Draft.

Career statistics

Regular season and playoffs

References

External links
 

1921 births
1993 deaths
Canadian expatriate ice hockey players in the United States
Canadian ice hockey centres
Ice hockey people from Saskatchewan
New Haven Ramblers players
New York Rangers players
New York Rovers players
St. Paul Saints (USHL) players
Sportspeople from Prince Albert, Saskatchewan